San Bartolomeo (Bartholomew the Apostle) is a church in Marne, Italy. It was an independent parish until the village of Marne became a municipality.

History

It is a building of the first half of 12th century; today only the apse of the original structure survives. The architectural structure of the building has a nave culminating in the apse that contains some frescoes whose age is difficult to determine.

The church underwent some renovations and expansion in the nineteenth and twentieth centuries. The apse was restored between 1984 and 1988.

Bibliography 

 Kubach, Hans Erich. Architettura romanica, Milano, Electa, 1978, 
 Le Goff, Jacques, L'uomo medievale, Laterza, 1999, 
 Labaa, Gian Maria. San Tomè in Almenno. Studi, ricerche, interventi per il restauro di una chiesa romanica. Bergamo, Lubrina, 2005, 
 Moris, Lorenzo and Alessandro Pellegrini. Sulle tracce del romanico in provincia di Bergamo, Bergamo, Prov. Bergamo, 2003
 Keller, Raffaella Poggiani; Filli Rossi; and Jim Bishop. Carta archeologica della Lombardia: carta archeologica del territorio di Bergamo. Modena, Panini, 1992. 
 Tosco, Carlo. Architetti e committenti nel romanico lombardo, Roma, Viella, 1997, 
 Labaa, Pino Capellini Giovan Maria. Itinerari dell'anno Mille, Bergamo, Sesab éditrice

Gallery

References

External links

12th-century Roman Catholic church buildings in Italy
Romanesque architecture in Lombardy
Churches in Lombardy